Jambugapuram is a village in the Papanasam taluk of Thanjavur district, Tamil Nadu, India.

Demographics 
At the 2001 census, Jambugapuram had a total population of 1911 with 978 males and 933 females. The sex ratio was 954. The literacy rate was 59.98.

References 
 

Villages in Thanjavur district